Chelonistele is a genus of the orchid family consisting of 13 currently accepted species. It is native to Indonesia, Malaysia and the Philippines. The plant grows as an epiphytic or lithophytic orchid.

The genus name of Anzia is named after Chelone (Greek mythology), a mountain nymph.

The genus was circumscribed by Ernst Hugo Heinrich Pfitzer in Pflanzenr. (Engler) IV. 50 IIB (Heft 32) on page 136 in 1907.

known species
As accepted as by Plants of the World Online (about 14),

Chelonistele amplissima (Ames & C.Schweinf.) Carr - Borneo
Chelonistele brevilamellata (J.J.Sm.) Carr - Kalimantan
Chelonistele dentifera de Vogel - Sarawak
Chelonistele devogelii  - Sarawak
Chelonistele ingloria (J.J.Sm.) Carr - Borneo
Chelonistele laetitia-reginae de Vogel - Sarawak
Chelonistele lamellulifera  - NW. Borneo
Chelonistele lurida Pfitzer in H.G.A.Engler (ed.) - Borneo
Chelonistele maximae-reginae  - Sabah
Chelonistele ramentacea J.J.Wood - Sarawak
Chelonistele richardsii Carr - Sarawak, Brunei
Chelonistele senagangensis J.J.Wood - Sabah
Chelonistele sulphurea (Blume) Pfitzer in H.G.A.Engler (ed.)
Chelonistele sulphurea var. crassifolia (Carr) de Vogel - Sabah
Chelonistele sulphurea var. sulphurea  - Borneo, Java, Malaysia, Sumatra, Philippines 
Chelonistele unguiculata Carr - Sarawak, Brunei

References

External links 

 The Internet Orchid Species Photo Encyclopedia

 
Arethuseae genera
Epiphytic orchids